Emperatriz is a Mexican telenovela produced by Fides Velasco for Azteca. It stars Gabriela Spanic as the title character, while Bernie Paz as the male lead. Other casts include Sergio de Bustamante, Julieta Egurrola, Adriana Louvier, Marimar Vega, Miriam Higareda, Alberto Guerra, Rafael Sanchez Navarro and Carmen Delgado. Omar Fierro made special appearance in the first five episodes, and later returns in the final part of the series.
The filming process took place between 17 March 2011 and 30 September 2011. The series premiered on 5 April 2011, 19 days after filming the first scene, at 8:30pm, occupying Prófugas del Destino'''s slot, and ended on 8 November 2011. Emperatriz is also known as best-selling telenovela of 2011.

Synopsis

Emperatriz (Gabriela Spanic) is an ex-con that has a relationship with Armando (Omar Fierro) who's a married man. Under false pretenses Emperatriz believed he truly love her but later discovered he was married.  They had a daughter together but her mother persuaded to leave it with Armando and his wife while she is still in prison. Years later, after Armando's latest visit Emperatriz got pregnant, but have an abortion provoked by a discussion over the phone with Armando.  While in the hospital she discovers that Armando betrayed her, he only manipulated her and he developed a scheme where Emperatriz will go to jail for the bank fraud he committed. Manuel (Rafael Sanchez Navarro) tells her to marry him in exchange of evidence he has against Armando.
 
At her mother's advice, Emperatriz gave her daughter away to Armando and his wife Alma Rosa, the daughter of Justo del Real (Sergio de Bustamante), the owner of the company del Real. Armando has 2 more daughters with Alma Rosa: Elisa and Elena. Emperatriz confronts Alma Rosa to find out who of the 3 girls is her daughter but during the confrontation Alma Rosa dies. Justo wants to take revenge on Emperatriz because of this.

Emperatriz's best friend Angela "Quimera" Galvan (Niurka Marcos) and Manuel set her up and Emperatriz spends 7 years in prison for a fraud she didn't commit. Both Emperatriz and Quimera fell in love with Armando during their youth. Quimera had a miscarriage because she fell down the stairs and she blames her son Nico for the accident. Quimera owns a nightclub.

Emperatriz returns from prison. She divorced Manuel. She searches for her daughter with Armando: she turns out to be Esther (Adriana Louvier). Both Emperatriz and Esther fall in love with Alejandro Miranda (Bernie Paz). Armando is presumed dead.

Justo turns out to be Emperatriz's father. Justo shoots Alejandro in the head and he suffers from memory loss.

It turns out that Armando is alive and that he had been kept hidden and imprisoned by Justo in cell, in a warehouse. Armando escapes. Alejandro and Emperatriz discover Justo but they keep him locked in the same warehouse. Manuel buries Justo alive and then goes away. Armando witnesses it but he doesn't save Justo. Perfecta dies.

After a turn of events Esther falls in love with Nico, Quimera and Manuel's son. Emperatriz witnesses Alejandro and Quimera kissing. She has a car accident and gets blind. Afterwards she recovers.

Quimera wants to shoot Emperatriz but Esther protects her and is shot in the back. Afterwards, at her club, she and some bodyguards fire towards Emperatriz, Alejandro and some cops, while trying to escape. Quimera reveals Emperatriz that it was Manuel and she who set her up for fraud and that they sent her in prison years before. She also tells her she did it because she always took everything away from her, for example Armando. Quimera asks Manuel on the phone to release her from prison otherwise she will testify against him to the police. A man shoots Quimera as she was testifying against Manuel at his order. Armando testifies against Manuel. Nico also wants to send into prison.

Emperatriz becomes the main shareholder of del Real Company. She tells Manuel to get out of the company. Afterwards, at del Real Company, Manuel threatens Emperatriz with a knife but Alejandro saves her. The police arrives to capture Manuel. He sets the basement on fire and escapes with the help of an ambulance.

At his house, Manuel drugs Emperatriz and then buries her alive, saying she did everything for her, that he loves her. Alejandro and a detective save her. The police arrives. Manuel jumps off his house. 
  
Alejandro and Emperatriz get married. 3 years later, the main characters are shown at a party: Alejandro and Emperatriz have twins (girls), Nico and Esther are waiting for a baby, Elisa and her husband, Elena and her husband Gonzalo have a boy.

Cast

Main cast

Special guest stars

Supporting cast

Production
This is the first appearance of Gabriela Spanic for Azteca's telenovela after she signed a contract with the company in December 2010.
Gaby Spanic wanted the role since she was a huge fan of the original version when it was aired in Venezuela, her birth country.
Proposed actresses for the role Emperatriz were Anette Michell and Edith González. While for Esther's role, Paola Nunez was mentioned, Gabriela Vergara and Edith González portrayed Emperatriz in two different unofficial pilot trailers.
Edith González refused to work in this telenovela since the producers wanted Niurka Marcos, whom she had problem in Salome, to star in this telenovela too. Gonzalez eventually joins Cielo Rojo and Niurka's participation was canceled and was replaced by Marcela Pezet. Niurka rejoins Emperatriz in its final stage.
Whereas for the male leads, Christian Meier, José Ángel Llamas and Mauricio Islas were proposed, Spanic refused to work with Islas and Llamas. She had once been romantically involved with Llamas while filming La Venganza (2002 telenovela) and had conflicts with Islas while filming Prisionera.
An unofficial pilot was released starring Edith González, Mauricio Islas and Alejandra Lazcano as Emperatriz, Alejandro and Esther respectively. All three left for Cielo Rojo. Sergio De Bustamante, Marimar Vega and Miri Higareda are also as seen in the trailer portraying their respective roles but with different looks. Other actors includes Rafael Sanchez Navarro portraying Armando Mendoza and Monica Dionne as Alma Rosa.
Bernie Paz, who was cast a week before the air date has worked together with Spanic in Tierra de Pasiones in 2006, where Paz portrayed the evil Dr. Fernando who is willing to do anything to have Valeria (Spanic). Spanic herself wanted to work with Paz again.
This novela marks the return of many actors such as Daniela Garmendia, Mercedes Pascual (last appeared in 2004 with Los Sanchez) and Marcela Pezet.
This novela is also the return of Azteca Digital's director, Elisa Salinas, now as the consulting producer of Azteca Novelas.
Bethel Flores was originally contacted as the writer of this version but was replaced by Veronica Suarez. After five episodes, Suarez left and was replaced by famous Colombian writer, Hector Forero, who had previously worked in various Azteca Novelas' productions before. In June 2011, Flores was contacted again and is set to join Forero and Mauricio Somuano in the third season of this telenovela, starting from the episode 80.
Most actors were part of TV Azteca's La duda, produced by Velasco in 2002. De Bustamante and Egurrola played husband and wife, with Pascual as De Bustamante's lover. Spanic's twin sister, Daniela Spanic and Guevara also starred in this novela.
Director Javier Patron Fox left the novela in mid September to direct the third season of Profugos in Chile, and was replaced by actor/director Martin Barraza, whom directed Pobre Diabla, Cuando seas mia, Vidas Robadas'' and other telenovelas produced by Fides Velasco.

Finale
Shortly after the grand final episode ended, "Emperatriz" quickly became a trending topic (Mexico) in Twitter. In 30 minutes time, it reached the fourth spot, from the eighth.

The final rating was 15.1

"Emperatriz de mis sueños"
Performed by Mónica Naranjo
Written by Jorge Avendaño Lührs
Editor: TV Azteca Publishing
Copyright Azteca Musica 2011

Other songs
The solo version of Franco De Vita's "Tan Sólo Tú" was used as the love theme for Elisa and Mauricio.

References

External links
First opening sequence
Seriesnow

2011 telenovelas
2011 Mexican television series debuts
2011 Mexican television series endings
Mexican telenovelas
TV Azteca telenovelas
Mexican television series based on Venezuelan television series
Spanish-language telenovelas